In music, Op. 6 stands for Opus number 6. Compositions that are assigned this number include:

 Barber – Cello Sonata
 Bartók – 14 Bagatelles
 Beethoven – Sonata in D major for piano four-hands, Op. 6
 Berg – Three Pieces for Orchestra
 Chopin – Mazurkas, Op. 6
 Corelli – Christmas Concerto
 Corelli – Concerto grosso in D major, Op. 6, No. 4
 Corelli – Twelve concerti grossi, Op. 6
 Enescu – Violin Sonata No. 2
 Handel – Concerti grossi, Op. 6
 Paganini – Violin Concerto No. 1
 Rachmaninoff – Morceaux de salon, Op. 6
 Reger – Drei Chöre, Op. 6
 Rimsky-Korsakov – Fantasy on Serbian Themes
 Schoenberg – Concerto for String Quartet and Orchestra
 Schumann – Davidsbündlertänze
 Scriabin – Piano Sonata No. 1
 Sibelius – Cassazione
 Strauss – Cello Sonata
 Strauss – Wiener Launen-Walzer
 Suk – Serenade for Strings
 Tchaikovsky – None but the Lonely Heart
 Vivaldi – Six Violin Concertos, Op. 6
 York – Les Gentilhommes